Juan Diego Calleros Ramos (born 19 April 1962) is a Mexican musician.
 
Calleros was born in Guadalajara, Mexico. He began playing in a group at age 13. Along with Fher Olvera and his brothers Ulises and Abraham, Juan was part of Sombrero Verde (1978–1985) which, in 1986, transformed to Maná. He has been an active member of Maná along with Olvera, Alex González and Sergio Vallín.

References

External links
 http://www.mana.com.mx/
 http://clavadoenunbar.blogspot.com/2006/09/juan-calleros-bajo.html

1962 births
Living people
Maná members
Mexican bass guitarists
Male bass guitarists
Latin Grammy Award winners
Latin Recording Academy Person of the Year honorees
Mexican male guitarists